Vranovice may refer to places in the Czech Republic:

 Vranovice (Brno-Country District), village and municipality in the South Moravian Region
 Vranovice (Příbram District), village and municipality in the Central Bohemian Region
 Vranovice-Kelčice, village and municipality in the Olomouc Region